The Erongo Desalination Plant, also known as the Orano Desalination Plant, is a sea water desalination plant in Namibia. The facility was constructed between 2008 and 2010 by Orano Mining Namibia, which at the time was known as Areva Resources Namibia. The desalination plant was established to supply water to Orano’s Trekkopje Uranium Mine. At the time this plant was commissioned, it was the largest reverse osmosis desalination plant in Southern Africa.

Location
The desalination plant is located in the Namib Desert, near the settlement of Wlotzkasbaken, in the Erongo Region of  Namibia. The geographical coordinates of Erongo Desalination Plant are 22°22'19.0"S, 14°26'28.0"E (Latitude:-22.371944; Longitude:14.441111).

Overview
The Erongo Desalination Plant was developed and is owned by Orano Resources Namibia (formerly Areva Resources Namibia). The purified drinking water was primarily intended for use in Orano's uranium mine known as the Trekkopje Mine, located near Arandis, Namibia. The plant is operated by Nafasi Water, a "water technology and water utility service company", based in Germiston, Gauteng, South Africa.

The potable water is then sold to NamWater, the national water utility company, for distribution to the city of Swakopmund, the nearby mines and other areas of Erongo Region. If the need arose new infrastructure can be added to supply  annually.

The raw sea water is taken through the following processes, during purification: (a) screen filtration (b) ultrafiltration (c) reverse osmosis (d) limestone contact and (e) chlorination.

Cost
The development of this water treatment plant cost N$2.5 billion (approx. US$153 million) in 2010.

Other developments
In July 2022, the owners of this facility signed a power purchase agreement (PPA) with InnoSun (a subsidiary of the French firm InnoVent) to design, build, own, operate and maintain a 5 MW solar power station and supply that energy to Erongo Desalination Plant for a 10-year contract term, starting on the date of commercial commissioning. Construction is expected to start during the second half of 2022, with commissioning expected in 2023. Orano expects the new solar farm to reduce the
desalination plant's carbon dioxide emissions by 30 percent or nearly 10,000 metric tonnes annually.

See also
 Desalination
 Witsand Solar Desalination Plant

References

External links
 Orano gives Erongo desalinated water As of 18 May 2020. 

Buildings and structures in Erongo Region
Water resources management
2010 establishments in Namibia
Mining in Namibia
Infrastructure in Namibia